The Federal Reserve's Jackson Hole Economic Symposium is a three-day annual international conference put on by the Federal Reserve Bank of Kansas City at Jackson Hole in the United States attended by central bank leaders from around the world.  Central bankers discuss world events and financial trends and the discussions at Jackson hole are watched for economic news and specifically the likely direction of global interest rates.

The event is held at vacation destination Jackson Lake Lodge in Grand Teton National Park, in Wyoming in the county of Teton. It was held in a few different locations in the late 1970's but Jackson Hole has been the location since 1981, placed there to get Paul Volcker to attend because of the great fly fishing there in late August.  Top economists from the Fed attend as well as other policy makers such as foreign central bankers.  Economic papers are published and presentations are given.  

The 1984 meeting focused on the causes of inflation. The 2016 meeting focused on the effects of central bank balance sheets on financial stability. The 2018 meeting focused on the effect of tech giants on the economy. At the 2020 meeting Jerome Powell announced a new policy for raising interest rates not simply based on joblessness or expectations of inflation.

During the COVID-19 pandemic the economic symposium was held virtually for 2020 and 2021. About 100-120 economists, central bankers, and journalists meet for the symposium.

The 2022 meeting was the first in-person meeting since 2020. Despite acknowledging the risk of recession, the majority of central bankers expressed their determination to increase interest rates for the purpose of curbing inflation. Bank of Japan Governor Haruhiko Kuroda was exceptional in expressing his need to continue reducing interest rates.

See also
 Federal Reserve Banks
 2021–2022 inflation surge
 2022 food crises
 2020s commodities boom
 List of highest-income counties in the United States

References

Bank regulation in the United States
United States

Financial regulatory authorities of the United States
 
Global economic conferences
Independent agencies of the United States government